Cervimunida is a genus of squat lobsters in the family Munididae, containing the following species:
 Cervimunida johni Porter, 1903
 Cervimunida princeps Benedict, 1902

References

Further reading

External links

Squat lobsters